Hackpfüffel is a village and a former municipality in the Mansfeld-Südharz district, in Saxony-Anhalt, Germany. Since 1 January 2009, it is part of the municipality Brücken-Hackpfüffel.

Geographical Location 
Hackpfüffel lies in the so-called Rieth in the lower Helme valley, north-east of the Kyffhäuser. The road between Kelbra and Artern goes through the town.

History

Origins 
In the year 899, the place was first mentioned as Bablide (German: Place on the swamp) erwähnt. In the year 1131, it was documented as Pefelde. At the beginning of the 13th Century, the place was in the possession of the Imperial Knight Thomas von Wallhausen. After 1231 Hackpfüffel was known as imperial estate Peflede. Variant spellings included Pefeld (1273) and Pefelde (1279).

In 1314 Hackpfüffel was split from Amt Brücken. On 23 April 1314 Fürst Otto II. von Anhalt pledged the village Pfeffele with all rights, except fiefdom of the church, for 70 Marks of Nordhäusen silver to Heinrich von Gehofen and his cousin Heinrich and Hermann Ha(c)ke. Since then the representatives of the family Hacke were in situ and the name of the family was added to the place name. So in 1436 the representation  Hackinpfeffelde was used.

Historical population 

Former municipalities in Saxony-Anhalt
Mansfeld-Südharz